RAF Sylt is a former Royal Air Force station located near Sylt, Schleswig-Holstein, Germany.

History

The following squadrons were posted here at some point:

 No. 2 Squadron RAF
 No. 3 Squadron RAF
 No. 4 Squadron RAF
 No. 14 Squadron RAF
 No. 16 Squadron RAF
 No. 21 Squadron RAF
 No. 26 Squadron RAF
 No. 33 Squadron RAF
 No. 41 Squadron RAF
 No. 56 Squadron RAF
 No. 69 Squadron RAF
 No. 80 Squadron RAF
 No. 107 Squadron RAF
 No. 302 Polish Fighter Squadron
 No. 305 Polish Bomber Squadron
 No. 308 Polish Fighter Squadron
 No. 317 Polish Fighter Squadron
 No. 349 (Belgian) Squadron RAF
 No. 350 (Belgian) Squadron RAF
 No. 411 "City of York" Squadron RCAF
 No. 412 (Canadian) Squadron RAF

Current use
This site is now Sylt Airport.

See also
 Royal Air Force Germany
 List of former Royal Air Force stations

References

Citations

Bibliography

External links

Buildings and structures in Schleswig-Holstein
Military units and formations disestablished in 1961
Military units and formations established in 1945
Sylt
Airports in Schleswig-Holstein